The Adrienne was a  46-gun frigate of the French Navy.

On 29 March 1811, she departed Toulon with Amélie, escorting the storeship Dromadaire carrying 8 tonnes of gunpowder and ammunition to Corfu. Two days later, the ships ran across a British squadron comprising HMS Unite and HMS Ajax. Dromadaire was captured, while the frigates managed to escape to Portoferraio.

She was renamed to Aurore on 11 April 1814, to Dauphine on 5 September 1829, and to Aurore again on 9 August 1830.

Sources and references 

Age of Sail frigates of France
Pallas-class frigates (1808)
1809 ships
Ships built in France